Eutrichomelina is a genus of flies in the family Sciomyzidae, the marsh flies or snail-killing flies.

Species
E. albibasis (Malloch, 1933)
E. fulvipennis (Walker, 1837)

References

Sciomyzidae
Sciomyzoidea genera